The 2014 Thuringian state election was held on 14 September 2014 to elect the members of the 6th Landtag of Thuringia. The government prior to the election was a grand coalition of the Christian Democratic Union (CDU) and Social Democratic Party (SPD) led by Minister-President Christine Lieberknecht. The government narrowly retained its majority. However, the SPD chose not to renew the coalition, instead pursuing an agreement to enter as a junior partner in a coalition with The Left and The Greens. After a vote of the SPD membership showed a majority in favour, the SPD went ahead with the agreement.

On 5 December the red-red-green coalition, led by The Left's Bodo Ramelow, was elected by the Landtag with 46 out of 91 votes. This was the first time in its history that The Left had become the leading party of a governing coalition in Germany. Ramelow became The Left's first ever head of a state government.

Parties
The table below lists parties represented in the 5th Landtag of Thuringia.

Opinion polling

Results
< 2009    Next >
|-
!style="background-color:#E9E9E9" align=left colspan="2" rowspan="2" width=400 |Party
!style="background-color:#E9E9E9" align=center colspan="3" |Popular vote
!style="background-color:#E9E9E9" align=center colspan="3" |Seats
|-
!style="background-color:#E9E9E9" align=right width=60|Votes
!style="background-color:#E9E9E9" align=right width=40|%
!style="background-color:#E9E9E9" align=right width=50|+/–
!style="background-color:#E9E9E9" align=right width=30|Seats
!style="background-color:#E9E9E9" align=right width=30|+/–
|-
|  Christlich Demokratische Union Deutschlands – CDU|| 315,096 || 33.5 || 2.3 || 34 || 4
|-
|  Die Linke|| 265,425 || 28.2 || 0.8 || 28 || 1
|-
|  Sozialdemokratische Partei Deutschlands – SPD|| 116,889 || 12.4 || 6.1 || 12 || 6
|-
|  Alternative für Deutschland – AfD|| 99,548 || 10.6 || 10.6 || 11 || 11
|-
|  Bündnis 90/Die Grünen|| 53,395 || 5.7 || 0.5 || 6 || 
|-
|colspan="15" style="background: #C0C0C0"|
|-
|  Nationaldemokratische Partei Deutschlands – NPD|| 34,018 || 3.6 || 0.7 || 0 || 
|-
|  Freie Demokratische Partei – FDP|| 23,352 || 2.5 || 5.1 || 0 || 7
|-
| bgcolor="white"| || align=left |Other parties|| 33,969 || 3.5 || 1.3 || 0 || 
|- style="background-color:#E9E9E9"
| align="right" colspan="2" | Valid votes
| 941,692 
| 98.6  
| 0.4
| colspan=2 rowspan=2 color=#BAB9B9|
|- style="background-color:#E9E9E9"
| align="right" colspan="2" | Invalid votes
| 13,271
| 1.4
| 0.4
|- style="background-color:#E9E9E9"
| align="right" colspan="2" | Totals and voter turnout
| 954,963	
| 52.7 
| 3.5
| 91
| 3
|- style="background-color:#BAB9B9"
| colspan="2" | Electorate
| 1,812,249	
| 100.00
| —
| colspan=2|
|-
| colspan=11 align=left | Source: Wahlrecht.de
|}

Outcome
While the incumbent grand coalition narrowly retained its majority, both parties underperformed expectations. This was especially true for the SPD, which recorded a result worse than it had polled at any point during the preceding five-year parliamentary term. For this reason, the SPD leadership decided to leave the coalition and seek other options. The most clear choice was a "red-red-green coalition" with The Left and Greens. Though this arrangement had successfully governed other states in the past, such a government had always been led by the SPD. Due to the dominance of The Left in Thuringia, however, the only viable option would be a government headed by Bodo Ramelow, leader of The Left. This was a highly controversial prospect due to the party's status as the successor of the Socialist Unity Party, the former ruling party of East Germany. Nonetheless, the SPD pursued the option. They resolved to seek approval from their party membership before signing any agreements, however, and held among the party membership for this purpose; 69.9% were in favour. The SPD therefore moved ahead with plans.

On 4 December, Ramelow was elected Minister-President by the Landtag on the second ballot, with a bare majority of 46 votes out of 91. Prior to the vote, thousands assembled outside the Landtag to protest the investiture of the government. Former East German dissidents were among the demonstrators, with some shouting "Stasi out!" and "The Social Democrats have betrayed us".

Notes

References

External links 
 Wahlumfragen zur Landtagswahl in Thuringia (wahlrecht.de)

2014 elections in Germany
Elections in Thuringia
September 2014 events in Germany